Adrian Quesada is an American musician, producer, and songwriter. He is best known for his work with Black Pumas. Quesada is an eight-time Grammy nominee and won Best Latin Rock or Alternative Album as a member of Grupo Fantasma in 2011.

Early life and education
Quesada grew up on the US-Mexico border in Laredo, Texas in the 1990s. As a child, he listened to punk and hip-hop as well as the Tex-Mex music he heard on both sides of the border. In a 2021 interview he said that although he soaked in the Latin music he was surrounded by, he did not fully appreciate it until he was in college.

Quesada started to play guitar when he was 13. He attended the University of Texas in Austin, due, in part, to the city's active music scene.

Career
In Austin, Quesada played in bands including Brownout, Ocote Soul Sound, Spanish Gold, Echocentrics, and Grupo Fantasma, with whom he played for 15 years. The Austin American Statesman described him as the "creative force behind four highly successful bands" who had become a "central figure in putting Austin on the contemporary Latin music map."

In late 2017, on the recommendation of a friend, Quesada contacted Eric Burton to sing on instrumentals he had recorded. They formed Black Pumas shortly after their first meeting, and released their self-titled debut in June 2019. Critically acclaimed, they were nominated for the Best New Artist Grammy four months after their first album was released. A deluxe version of their debut and a live album were subsequently released; as of 2022 the Black Pumas had received six Grammy nominations, including Album of the Year and Song of the Year. They played more than 60 live shows prior to and after the COVID-19 pandemic and, in addition to other television shows, they appeared on Austin City Limits, the Grammy Awards telecast, Late Show with Stephen Colbert and Celebrating America, the concert following the Biden inauguration.

In early 2022, inspired by the Latin American psychedelic ballads of the sixties and seventies, Quesada recorded Boleros Psicodélicos. Set for release in June, iLe, Gabriel Garzón-Montano, Girl Ultra and Marc Ribot are featured on the record, which includes classic balada music as well as Quesada's original compositions. Rolling Stones Ernesto Lechner wrote that with its "remarkable intensity and a mind-boggling attention to detail", the album "promised to be one of 2022's most gorgeous releases". The first single from the album, "Mentiras con Cariño" (featuring iLe), was released in March 2022. It was Quesada's first solo single.

Well-known as a producer, Quesada works out of his Austin studio, Electric Deluxe. In addition the Black Pumas records, he has more than 150  production credits, including Look at My Soul: The Latin Shade of Texas Soul, his collection of original songs and re-recordings of Chicano soul classics.

Selected discography

Awards and nominations

Grammy Awards

References

People from Laredo, Texas
Year of birth missing (living people)
Living people
Singer-songwriters from Texas
University of Texas alumni